The Oregon Institute of Marine Biology (or OIMB) is the marine station of the University of Oregon. This  marine station is located in Charleston, Oregon at the mouth of Coos Bay. Currently, OIMB is home to several permanent faculty members and a number of graduate students. OIMB is a member of the National Association of Marine Laboratories (NAML). In addition to graduate research, undergraduate classes are offered year round, including marine birds and mammals, estuarine biology, marine ecology, invertebrate zoology, molecular biology, biology of fishes, biological oceanography, and embryology.

The Loyd and Dorothy Rippey Library, one of eight branches of the UO Libraries, was added to the campus in 1999. The Rippey Library is open to the public by appointment, and the Oregon Card Program allows Oregon residents 16 years old and over to borrow from the collection.

The Charleston Marine Life Center (or CMLC) is a public museum and aquarium on the edge of the harbor in Charleston, OR, across the street from the OIMB campus. Displays aimed at visitors of all ages emphasize the diversity of animal and plant life in local marine ecosystems. Visitors learn where to interact with marine organisms in their natural environments and how local scientists study the life histories, evolution and ecology of underwater plants and animals.

History 

The University of Oregon first established OIMB as a summer research and education program in 1924, operating out of tents along the beach of Sunset Bay.  OIMB settled into its current location in 1931, when 100 acres of the Coos Head Military Reserve, including several buildings from the Army Corps of Engineers, was deeded to the University of Oregon.  In 1937, OIMB was transferred to Oregon State College (now Oregon State University), and remained theirs until the federal government required the property during World War II.  Following the war, OIMB was initially returned to Oregon State University, but the University of Oregon reclaimed it in 1955 as a summer research facility.  Since 1966, OIMB has been expanding its educational programs and its campus, constructing more teaching and research facilities and developing year-round educational programs.  Notably, the Loyd and Dorothy Rippey Library was built in 1999, and construction of the Charleston Marine Life Center began in 2012.  The CMLC is entirely powered by a wind turbine that was erected in 2014.  OIMB has functioned as a year-round research facility since 1966, and courses were developed for fall, spring, and summer soon after.  Winter classes became available beginning in 2017.

Research Vessels 

OIMB operates the R/V Pluteus, a 42-foot aluminum-hull trawler, the R/V Pugettia, a 20-foot aluminum (Woolridge) boat, and several small vessels, including flat-bottom aluminum boats, an inflatable zodiac, and a large kayak.

OIMB also has its own 600 m Phantom ROV (Remotely Operated Vehicle).

Courses 
The Oregon Institute of Marine Biology offers both undergraduate and graduate level courses each term, which are open to University of Oregon students as well as students from other institutions.

Courses offered are as follows:

 Invertebrate Zoology
 Marine Ecology
 Estuarine Biology
 Deep-sea and Subtidal Ecology
 Biological Oceanography
 Marine Environmental Issues
 Cell Biology
 Marine Conservation Biology
 Molecular Biology for Marine Sciences
 Comparative Embryology and Larval Biology
 Animal Behavior
 Marine Birds and Mammals
 Biology of Fishes
 Introduction to Experimental Design and Statistics

Various weekend workshops during the summer including:

 Parasitology 
 Biological Illustrations 
 Seaweed Biology 
 Marine Biological Invasions 
 Marine Bioluminescence

See also
 Hatfield Marine Science Center, a similar research facility associated with the Oregon State University and located in Newport, Oregon
 Hopkins Marine Station, a similar research facility run by Stanford University in Monterey, California

References

External links
 Oregon Institute of Marine Biology
 Follow OIMB on Twitter! 
 University of Oregon Homepage

Buildings and structures in Coos County, Oregon
Marine biology
Research institutes in Oregon
University of Oregon
Biological research institutes in the United States
Education in Coos County, Oregon